Argiris Kavidas (October 9, 1976 – September 12, 2010) was a Greek actor and director best known for his role in the 2009 Greek dramatic film, Strella, which is also known by the international title, A Woman's Way. Kavidas portrayed Nikos in the film. Kavidas also appeared in several other films and theater productions during his career.

Kavidas died of cardiac arrest in Athens on September 12, 2010, at the age of 33.

References

External links

1976 births
2010 deaths
21st-century Greek male actors
Greek male film actors
Greek male stage actors